Maigret Hesitates is a detective novel by the Belgian writer Georges Simenon.

Overview
When a series of letters, written on expensive stationery, arrive at Maigret's desk stating that a murder will take place but that the writer is unsure as to who will die, who will do the killing, and when the killing will occur, Maigret's interest is piqued and he soon tracks the stationery down to the house of Emile Parendon, an eminent lawyer. But, once there, tracking down clues to a crime not yet committed is not so easy and when a murder does take place the choice of victim surprises even Maigret.

Originally written in French in 1968, the novel was translated into English by Lyn Moir and published by Harcourt Brace in 1969.

Adaptations
Maigret hésite appeared on French television with Bruno Cremer as Maigret on 26 May 2000 under the title Maigret chez les riches. Also with Jean Richard as Maigret on 6 December 1975 and in a Russian version under the title Megre Kolebletsya  with Boris Tenine as Maigret in 1981.

References

1968 Belgian novels
Maigret novels
Presses de la Cité books